The Wadi Dawan attack was an ambush attack on Belgian tourists traveling in a convoy through Hadhramaut in the Wadi Dawan desert valley on January 18, 2008.

Details
A convoy of four jeeps carrying 15 tourists to Shibam were ambushed by gunmen in a hidden pickup truck. Two Belgian women, Claudine Van Caillie, of Bruges, 63, and Katrine Glorie, from East Flanders, 54, as well as two Yemenis, a driver and a guide, were killed; another man was also heavily wounded, several others suffered minor wounds. The tourists were repatriated to Belgium on January 19, except the injured man, who remained in Sanaa.

In the wake of the attack, Belgian Minister of Foreign Affairs, Karel De Gucht originally rejected that Al-Qaeda might be responsible, explaining that although the possibility could be avoided, internecine disputes and latent Islamism also to be taken into account. A number of arrests were made on January 21.

Reactions
 President of the European Council Slovenia released a statement saying "The EU Presidency strongly condemns all forms of violence and calls on the  government of Yemen to bring the perpetrators of these crimes to justice."

See also
List of terrorist incidents, 2008
2007 attack on tourists in Yemen

References

External links
bbc.co.uk

2008 murders in Yemen
Terrorist incidents in Yemen in 2008
Mass murder in 2008
Mass shootings in Yemen
Attacks on tourists
Belgium–Yemen relations
January 2008 crimes
January 2008 events in Asia